Airbus Corporate Jets, a business unit of Airbus SAS and part of Airbus, markets and completes corporate jet variants from the parent's airliner range. Types include the A318 Elite to the double/triple-decked Airbus A380 Prestige. Following the entry of the 737 based Boeing Business Jet, Airbus joined the business jet market with the A319 Corporate Jet in 1997. Although the term Airbus Corporate jet was initially used only for the A319CJ, it is now often used for all models, including the VIP widebodies. As of June 2019, 213 corporate and private jets are operating; 222 aircraft have been ordered, including  A320 family jets.

An Airbus Corporate Jet Centre is based at Toulouse, France, and specialises in single-aisle aircraft.

Narrow-body aircraft

The ACJ family is based on the successful A320 family of aircraft, beginning with the A319CJ. Today any version of the A320 is available as corporate jet with 180 minute ETOPS rating.

ACJ318

The ACJ318 offered a range of 4,200 nmi or 7,800 km.
The smallest of the ACJ family, based on the passenger A318, was offered in passenger configurations between 14 and 18 passengers.

ACJ319

The ACJ319 offered a range of 6,000 nmi or 11,100 km.
This model is the corporate jet version of the A319. Upon resale the aircraft can be reconfigured as a standard A319 by removing its extra tanks, thus maximizing its resale value. Certificated both European JAA and American FAA, the A319LR and ACJ are the only business jets approved for public transport on both sides of the Atlantic.
In 2018, its unit cost was $105M.

The aircraft seats between 19 and 50 passengers but may be outfitted by the customers into any configuration. DC Aviation, UB Group, and Reliance Industries are among its users. The A319CJ competes with the Boeing BBJ1, Gulfstream G550, and Bombardier Global Express. Because of its wider fuselage diameter, it offers a roomier interior than its competitors. It is powered by the same engine types as the A320, either the CFM International CFM56-5 or the V2527.

The A319CJ was used by the Escadron de transport, d'entrainement et de calibration which is in charge of transportation for France's officials, and was also ordered by the Flugbereitschaft of the Luftwaffe for transportation of Germany's officials. Since 2003, an ACJ is a presidential aircraft of Armenia, Brazil, Czech Republic, Italy, Malaysia, Slovakia, Thailand, Turkey, Ukraine and Venezuela.

ACJ320

The ACJ320 offered a range of 4,300 nmi or 7,800 km.
The A320 Prestige is offered as a variant for passengers who want more interior space than the A319 offers. It has a passenger capacity of 30  with two removable fuel tanks. In 2018, its unit cost was $115M.

ACJ321

ACJ319neo/ACJ320neo

The CFM LEAP or Pratt & Whitney PW1000G lower fuel-burn provides additional range along with lower engine noise while the cabin altitude does not exceed .
To increase its fuel capacity, the ACJ319neo is offered with up to five additional centre tanks (ACT).

The ACJ320neo first flight was on 16 November 2018, starting a short test-programme for the extra fuel tanks and greater cabin pressurisation.
It was first delivered to Acropolis Aviation on 16 January 2019.
On 25 April 2019, the ACJ319neo completed its first flight, before a short test campaign and delivery to German K5 Aviation, outfitted with five ACTs.
The CFM Leap-powered ACJ319neo was certified by the EASA on 9 July.
In 2021, the equipped price of the ACJ319neo was $105M, and $115M for the ACJ320neo.

ACJ321LR
Long range neo variant. The ACJ321LR has a range of 8,175 nmi (15,140 km) which is the longest range of any narrowbody plane.

ACJ TwoTwenty
To increase its range the ACJ Two twenty is offered with up to five removable auxiliary centre tanks (ACT).

Airbus expects to launch the ACJ TwoTwenty in the first quarter of 2023.
The ACJ TwoTwenty made its first flight on 14 December 2021, before delivery to Comlux to be outfitted with a VIP cabin in Indianapolis.
In 2022, its equipped price was $78M.

Specifications

Wide-body aircraft

The VIP widebodies are based on the A330/A340/A350/A380 aircraft. Additional fuel tanks extend the range, with most increase for the A330 Prestige.

ACJ330-200

ACJ330neo
The ACJ330neo is based on the new A330neo with the "Harmony" cabin concept. It has a capacity of 25 passengers and a range of 10400 nmi (19260 km).

ACJ340-300

Based on Airbus' first four engine design, the ETOPS immune A340-300 Prestige offers a  range for 75 passengers. It is powered by four CFM56-5C4/P engines, each rated at  thrust.

ACJ340-500

The ACJ340-500 is a longer range complement to the A340-300 Prestige with a  range as a result of having a higher fuel capacity and an updated wing with increased span and area. It carries 75 passengers and can link almost any imaginable city pair on the globe.

ACJ340-600

ACJ350 

This range is the distance between two antipodes, allowing to connect any suitable airport.

ACJ380-800
One executive variant of the Airbus A380 was ordered in 2012, with two full decks and a third deck in the cargo compartment, but the aircraft was sold as a regular aircraft before modifications were made. The undelivered plane, ordered by Prince Al-Waleed bin Talal, was to be called "Prestige". The Guardian reported the plane was sold amid disputes between Forbes and Talal relating to the size of his fortune and his efforts to affect his ranking in Forbes billionaires list.

, plans to retrofit one of the first A380s to be retired from service with Singapore Airlines as a business jet were reported to be "at a very advanced stage". Refitting a retired A380 would cost less than buying a new A330 or Boeing 777 business jet.

Specifications

Orders, deliveries, and operators

References

Notes

External links
 
 Airbus Corporate Helicopters

Airbus subsidiaries and divisions